This is a list of people who have served as Custos Rotulorum of Derbyshire.

 Sir John Vernon bef. 1544 – aft. 1544
 Sir Francis Leke bef. 1547 – bef. 1580
 Sir John Manners 1580–1611 
 George Manners bef. 1617–1617 
 William Cavendish, 2nd Earl of Devonshire 1617–1628
 Edward Sackville, 4th Earl of Dorset 1628–1646
 Interregnum
 William Cavendish, 1st Duke of Newcastle 1660–1676
 Henry Cavendish, 2nd Duke of Newcastle 1677–1689
 William Cavendish, 1st Duke of Devonshire 1689–1707
For later custodes rotulorum, see Lord Lieutenant of Derbyshire.

References

Institute of Historical Research - Custodes Rotulorum 1544-1646
Institute of Historical Research - Custodes Rotulorum 1660-1828

Derbyshire